Ellis T. Johnson Arena is a 6,500-seat multi-purpose arena in Morehead, Kentucky, United States. Located in the Academic-Athletic Center on the campus of Morehead State University, it is the home to the Morehead State Eagles men's and women's basketball teams. Construction began in 1978, and the building opened in 1981. The Eagles won their inaugural game in the building on Dec. 3, 1981, over the University of Charleston. Johnson Arena can be easily transformed into an auditorium for concerts and commencements. At the east end of the playing floor, a hydraulic stage can be raised for events.

Johnson Arena largely replaced Wetherby Gymnasium which continues to house the Eagles volleyball team.  It hosted the Ohio Valley Conference men's basketball tournament in 1984, and has also hosted such entertainment acts as Alabama, David Letterman, M.C. Hammer, the Goo Goo Dolls, Alan Jackson, Dashboard Confessional, Jeff Foxworthy, Tim McGraw, Travis Tritt and Sawyer Brown.

The arena is named after former Morehead State basketball, baseball, and football coach, Ellis T. Johnson.

See also
 List of NCAA Division I basketball arenas

References

College basketball venues in the United States
Indoor arenas in Kentucky
Morehead State Eagles men's basketball
Basketball venues in Kentucky
Buildings and structures in Rowan County, Kentucky
1981 establishments in Kentucky
Sports venues completed in 1981